Henry Ray is an American former professional basketball player and coach. He played college basketball for the McNeese State Cowboys from 1972 to 1975 and is considered one of the program's best players.

Ray is a native of Alexandria, Louisiana. He was a standout on the Cowboys team that won the Southland Conference championship during the 1974–75 season. Ray was selected as the Southland Conference Men's Basketball Player of the Year in 1975. His 1,902 points and 883 rebounds both rank fifth in program history.

Ray played several seasons of professional basketball. He served as an assistant coach at Lafayette High School from 1982 to 1990, and Bryan Station High School from 1990 to 1997. Ray was an assistant coach for the Transylvania Pioneers women's basketball team for sixteen seasons.

Ray was inducted into the McNeese Sports Hall of Fame in 1990. He was named to the Southland Conference 1970s All-Decade Men's Basketball Team in 2013.

References

External links
College statistics

Year of birth missing (living people)
Living people
American men's basketball coaches
American men's basketball players
Basketball players from Louisiana
Forwards (basketball)
McNeese Cowboys basketball players
Sportspeople from Alexandria, Louisiana